Compaq LTE was a line of laptop computers made by Compaq, introduced in 1989. The first models, Compaq LTE and Compaq LTE 286, were among the first computers to be close to the size of a paper notebook, spurring the use of the term "notebook" to describe a smaller laptop, and earned a notable place in laptop history. They were also among the first to include both a built-in hard disk and a floppy disk drive, and later models offered optional docking stations, providing performance comparable to then-current desktop machines.

History

Compaq introduced the LTE in 1989. At the time of launch, virtually no "notebook"-style fully-fledged computers existed. Prior to the LTE series, portable computers were bulky, such as Compaq SLT, which is coined as the predecessor to the LTE series, despite both models existing side by side for some time. Compaq SLT had large full-size 3.5-inch hard drives, and was heavy at 6.5 kg in comparison to the LTE at approximately 2.5 kg.

Models

Original model specifications
The two original LTE models differed primarily in the processor availability; however, the 286 model came with a standard 40 MB hard drive in place of the base model's 20 MB. They ran MS-DOS version 3.31.

Later models

The success of the original LTE series led Compaq to apply the designation to later models. LTE 386s/20 made extensive use of flexible electronics for the motherboard and motherboard interconnects. Other later Compaq LTE computers had a pointing stick in the middle of the keyboard, however, the LTE Elite 486 models had a trackball mounted to the right of the LCD screen. The LTE Elite series had an easily removable hard drive for data security purposes. Starting with LTE 386s/20, the LTE series computers were able to connect to a (in some cases, powered) docking station to act as a regular desktop computer. Later models' designs provide for the easy removal the floppy drive to add an internal CD-ROM drive, which was an expensive upgrade option for the late LTE series. The last LTE laptops were the 5000 series, ending with the 5400, which had a 150 MHz Pentium processor, and was quite capable of running Windows 98SE. It also allowed for swappable Floppy/CD-ROM drives.

Docking stations 

The LTE range was marketed as a desktop replacement solution, and with its docking options, allowed peripherals to be permanently connected. The LTE laptop would be simply removed from the docking station to be used on the go, and then docked to use in the office.

There were different docking station options for the differing LTE models.

^ Note: The MultiBay Expansion Base and MultiBay-ISA Expansion Base are virtually the same, with the MultiBay-ISA Expansion Base having an ISA slot in the back panel, and a speaker assembly.

Trivia
 There is a Compaq LTE 386s/20 on display at the Derby Computer Museum in Derby, UK. It was the museum founder's first ever laptop.
 When the LTE Lite series was first released in 1992, there were only four models released: Lite/25, Lite/25E, Lite/25C, and Lite 4/25C (486/25). Later, in 1993, there was a 486 33 MHz version of the Lite model, which was relatively unknown
 Compaq LTE 5280, released in 1995, was still used in 2016 by McLaren Automotive to service the McLaren F1 supercar.
 The LTE Lite allows you to have two serial interfaces with an add-in card. It's one of the very few laptops that have this capability.

In popular culture
 The Compaq LTE/286 model was used seen in the 1994 Season 1, Episode 22 of Frasier.
 The Compaq LTE Elite 4/75CX model was featured in Jungle 2 Jungle.
 In a Homestar Runner DVD exclusive Easter egg short "Real-Live E-Mails", a Compaq LTE was used as a live-action stand-in for Strong Bad's Lappy 486 computer.

See also

 NEC UltraLite

References

External links
Article describing original LTE/286
Compaq LTE Owners Facebook Enthusiasts Group

LTE
Computer-related introductions in 1989
Articles containing video clips
Business laptops